Remploy is an organisation in the United Kingdom which provides employment placement services for disabled people. It is a major welfare-to-work provider, delivering a range of contracts and employment programmes, for people with substantial barriers to work. Between 2009 and 2014, it found 100,000 jobs for disabled people.

Historically, it also directly employed disabled people in a number of factories owned by Remploy itself and subsidised by the UK government, though these were phased out at the start of the 21st century.

History

Enterprise business and factories
Remploy was originally established under the terms of the Disabled Persons (Employment) Act 1944, to directly employ disabled persons in specialised factories. It opened its first factory in Bridgend, Wales, in 1946. Over the following decades it established a network of 83 factories across the UK making a wide variety of products. These were organised into a number of sub-businesses, such as Remploy e-cycle, which dealt with the safe disposal and recycling of electrical appliances.

In the late 20th century it also moved into service businesses, such as monitoring CCTV images.

To further subsidise Remploy businesses, the government made regulations, in 2006, stating that every public body should reserve at least one contract for 'supported businesses' (those where over 50% of employees are disabled); in this way, public bodies could fulfil corporate social responsibility objectives. These Public Contracts Regulations (specifically, Regulation 7) restrict the tendering process for goods or services to 'supported businesses'.

Employment advice and support services
In the later years of the Blair ministry, at the start of the 21st century, Remploy underwent a major change to its operation, and branched out into providing general employment assistance for disabled people, and others with barriers to employment. After the closure of most Remploy factories, the provision of these assistance services became Remploy's principal purpose.

In 2006, Remploy Employment Services opened its first high-street branch in Newhall Street, Birmingham; since that date a further forty branches and thirty offices have opened from Glasgow to Plymouth, often in the same general location as their former factory sites. The five-year project to develop Remploy as a high-street brand allowed the business to support its vision of assisting over 10,000 disabled customers into mainstream employment, a target achieved in the financial year of 2009–10.

In 2009 Remploy was selected as a prime- and sub-contractor to deliver the then government's 'Flexible New Deal' contract, which aimed to help the long-term unemployed back into work. After the change in government, a year later, it became a sub-contractor in the Coalition government's Work Programme.

In 2009/10 Remploy placed over 10,500 people into jobs across a range of sectors.

In March 2010, Remploy went mobile: two thirty-foot mobile 'jobs mobiles' were rolled out in the High Peaks and South Yorkshire to support the FND programme. The mobile units have provided support to disabled customers in the most hard-to-reach geographical areas where access to public transport is limited.

Factory closures
In 2007, Remploy management announced proposals to close 42 Remploy factories; this was later reduced to 28 after heated debates at the TUC and Labour conferences, with then-Work and Pensions minister Peter Hain requiring proposed factory closures to have ministerial approval. Eventually, 29 factories were closed in 2008.

In December 2010, the Coalition government commissioned a review of the government's special employment programmes for disabled people. The review was carried out by Liz Sayce, the head of RADAR, the largest disability campaigning organisation in the country, and was published in early 2012. The review concluded that there would be inevitably be people who failed to benefit from whatever the government did, but that the best use of government money would be to concentrate on getting disabled people into mainstream work, rather than subsidising disabled-only factories.

The Coalition government announced that it would generally accept the report, and consequently would withdraw its subsidy to Remploy factories. This led to Remploy's proposing to immediately close the 36 least financially viable factories, among its 54 remaining factories, potentially making 1,700 workers redundant.

Thirty-three factories were eventually closed in 2012, with the loss of 1,752 jobs. Of these, one – Bristol – was the subject of a viable bid (from The Rehab Group), but the bidder subsequently withdrew. An additional factory, among the 36 that had been threatened with immediate closure, was sold to Nationwide Filters Company Ltd; the factory, based in Barrow-in-Furness, had manufactured air filters.

The future of the remaining 20 sites remained unclear, but in December 2012 ministers said some would close, while others might become independent businesses without government funding. The fate of these 20 remaining sites were as follows:

In addition, the Cook with Care business, based in Liverpool, was spun off into a Social Enterprise. Also the CCTV image monitoring business was sold to Enigma CCTV Ltd, a subsidiary of Enigma Security Solutions Ltd, on 17 December 2013.

Privatisation
In July 2014, the Department for Work and Pensions (DWP) announced that it was looking for Remploy Employment Services to leave government control, by way of a joint venture between a private company and Remploy's employees. In March 2015, it was confirmed that Remploy would become owned by US service provider Maximus (70%) and an employee trust (30%). The transfer of ownership was completed on 7 April 2015.

References

External links
Official Remploy site
Furniture Manufacture on former Remploy Swansea site

Department for Work and Pensions
Disability organisations based in the United Kingdom
British companies established in 1944
Former nationalised industries of the United Kingdom
1944 establishments in England